In mathematics, an iterable cardinal is a type of large cardinal introduced by , and , and further studied by . Sharpe and Welch defined a cardinal κ to be iterable if every subset of κ is contained in a weak κ-model M for which there exists an M-ultrafilter on κ which allows for wellfounded iterations by ultrapowers of arbitrary length.
Gitman gave a finer notion, where a cardinal κ is defined to be α-iterable
if  ultrapower iterations only of length α are required to wellfounded. (By standard arguments iterability is equivalent to ω1-iterability.)

References

External links
Diagram of iterable cardinals

Large cardinals